Hellinsia pizarroi is a moth of the family Pterophoridae. It is found in Ecuador.

The wingspan is 30 mm. The forewings are dark brown and the hindwings and fringes are brown-grey. Adults are on wing in February, at an altitude of 2,900 m.

Etymology
The species is named after the Spanish conquistador Francisco Pizarro, the first European to set foot in many parts of South America.

References

Moths described in 2011
pizarroi
Moths of South America